The 1962 Florida Gators football team represented the University of Florida during the 1962 NCAA University Division football season. The season was the third of Ray Graves' ten seasons as the head coach of the Florida Gators football team.  Graves' 1962 Florida Gators posted a 7–4 overall record and a 4–2 record in the Southeastern Conference (SEC), placing fifth in twelve-team SEC. The Gators won the Gator Bowl again in 1962, upsetting ninth-ranked Penn State. They wore the Confederate Battle Flag on the side of their helmets to pump up the southern team facing a favored northern school.

Schedule

Game summaries

Mississippi State

Auburn
Auburn came to Gainesville ranked #5 and left with a 22–3 defeat. The Gators intercepted two passes, and recovered three fumbles.

References

Florida
Florida Gators football seasons
Gator Bowl champion seasons
Florida Gators football